José María Torre (born José María Torre Hütt on November 4, 1977, in San Salvador, El Salvador) is a Mexican Salvador-born actor and fashion designer known for his roles in telenovelas. He is the brother of Fátima Torre and Andrea Torre. He started his career at the age of five doing television commercials.

Biography
Born in San Salvador, El Salvador into a large family, that encompasses four brothers and six sisters, two of them are actresses: Andrea and Fátima. Jose María is Catholic.

He started his acting career when his family moved to Mexico City at the age of 5 years old doing commercials. At age 12, he obtained a small role in the telenovela Yo compro esa mujer, playing the child version of Alejandro (Eduardo Yáñez). Later that year, he also appeared in Amor de nadie starred by Lucía Méndez. Three years later, he played the character of Lucero's brother in Los parientes pobres. In 1994, he also starred in Agujetas de color de rosa and also performed two songs for the telenovela's soundtrack: "Siempre estarás en mí" (duet with Irán Castillo) and "Cruce de sonrisas". Since then, he has made more than ten telenovelas with Televisa. In addition to his acting career, he also pursued fashion design; he released his line of clothes on October 27, 2005.

Several years later, he debuted in Telemundo and starred in Dueños del paraíso with Kate del Castillo and Jorge Zabaleta. In 2016, he obtained a major villain role in Señora Acero: La Coyote, opposite Carolina Miranda and Luis Ernesto Franco. Two years after, he returned to Televisa and joined the legal drama Por amar sin ley in the role of Roberto Morelli, one of the key lawyers of the Vega y Asociados law firm who falls in love with Victoria Escalante (Altaír Jarabo).

Filmography

Film

Television roles

References

External links
  José María Torre at esmas.com
 Profile and chat archive at the telenovela database
 

1977 births
Living people
Mexican male child actors
Mexican male film actors
Mexican male stage actors
Mexican male telenovela actors
Mexican male television actors
Mexican fashion designers
Male actors from Mexico City
Mexican Roman Catholics